The Abryanz Style and Fashion Awards 2016 is the fourth edition of the Abryanz Style and Fashion Awards and it was held on 9 December 2016 at the Kampala Serena Hotel under the theme Dress to Inspire. Vimbai Mutinhiri and Idris Sultan hosted the awarding event while Hellen Lukoma and Zimbabwe’s Tinashe Venge hosted the red carpet event.

This edition was the first to nominate and  award continental fashion stakeholders as all the previous editions only nominated and awarded East Africans. The continental launch was held in Namibia at the Windhoek Fashion Week.

Nominations were open to the public on 5 September 2016 and the nominees were unveiled on  27 October 2016 at a media launch at Kampala Serena Hotel.

Acts and showcases
Ugandan artiste Ceaserous performed his hit single Dangerous. Kenya's Avril and Nigeria's Runtown also performed on the awarding stage while Bebe Cool performed at the red carpet event.

Anita Beryl, the winner for Fashion Designer of the year (Uganda) showcased her designer collection. Other showcases were by David Tlale, the highlight showcase of the night and swim model Nina Mirembe who showcased her collection of handmade bikini wear.

Nominees and winners
The winners are highlighted and bold.

See also 
 Abryanz Style and Fashion Awards (ASFAs)

References 

Fashion awards
Award ceremonies